J. Vincent Edwards (born 20 June 1947) is a British singer. He became well known in the musical Hair in 1968, and began recording a series of singles. The most notable was a song called "Thanks" (1969), which has subsequently appeared on a number of compilation albums. Edwards also contributed to the Bloomfield soundtrack.

Later Edwards turned to song writing. With Pierre Tubbs he wrote "Right Back Where We Started From", which was a No. 8 hit in the UK Singles Chart for Maxine Nightingale in November 1975, and a No. 2 hit in the US in May 1976. In addition, Edwards wrote songs with Miki Antony and Kris Ife.

Edwards was also a part of the trio Star Turn on 45 (Pints), who had a UK hit with "Pump Up the Bitter" in 1988. He released a solo album entitled Thanks in 2002.

Partial singles discography
 "Thanks" (1969)
 "Who Are My Friends" (1970)
 "(Sha La La La La) Shangri-La" (1971)
 "Wonderland" (1974)
 "Love Hit Me" (1976)
 "Hands Off" (1980)

References

External links

 Official website
 

1947 births
Living people
British songwriters
British pop singers